Action Sports Alliance (The Alliance) is a non-profit association of professional female skateboarders and other action sports athletes. The Alliance was founded in 2005 by Cara-Beth Burnside, Mimi Knoop, and Drew Mearns. Burnside was the first president.

In 2006, the Alliance helped negotiate significant prize money increases for female vert and street skateboarders at the X Games and helped add a women's surfing event to the line-up.  

The business of the Alliance is run by a board of directors composed of leading professional athletes who are elected and appointed by the pro membership according to the organization bylaws.

References

External links

Women's sports organizations in the United States
Non-profit organizations based in San Diego
Organizations established in 2005
2005 establishments in the United States